Asociacion Deportiva Metapaneca Leones de Occidente  are a Salvadoran professional football club based in Metapan, El Salvador.

History
On2015 the club had purchased the spot of C.D. Guadulapano spot to be able to compete in the newly increased second division.

Personnel

Current technical staff

List of coaches
 Edwin Portillo (May 2015–)

References

External links
 https://web.archive.org/web/20150708064003/http://adleonesdeoccidente.com/
 http://www.futboldelsalvador.com/2015/03/nuevo-proyecto-de-fubtol-en-metapan.html
 http://metapanecos.com/asociacion-deportiva-leones-de-occidente-un-nuevo-proyecto-futbolistico/

Football clubs in El Salvador
Association football clubs established in 2015
2015 establishments in El Salvador
Metapán